"The Barbarian" is the opening track on the eponymous debut album of British progressive rock band Emerson, Lake & Palmer, released in 1970.

Description 
The song is instrumental, and it is the shortest song on the album (4:27). Although the composition of "The Barbarian" was attributed to the three band members, it is an arrangement for rock band of Béla Bartók’s 1911 piano piece Allegro barbaro. Although the original piece is for piano only, the band arranged the song for organ, piano, bass, and drums. The music of the song is aggressive with a heavy metal style. Greg Lake used a fuzz box to give his bass a fuller, guitar-like sound. The band members did not give credit to Bartók, thinking that the label would arrange the matter. Bartók's family sued ELP for copyright infringement, but eventually, the band gave equal credit to Bartók. The song was never included in a compilation album of the band until the album The Essential Emerson, Lake & Palmer.

Personnel
Keith Emerson - Hammond organ, piano
Greg Lake -  bass guitar
Carl Palmer - drums, percussion

References

1970 songs
Emerson, Lake & Palmer songs
British hard rock songs
Rock instrumentals
Compositions by Béla Bartók